Sugo (International title: The Chosen One / ) is a Philippine television drama action series broadcast by GMA Network. Directed by Dominic Zapata and Lore Reyes,  it stars Richard Gutierrez in the title role. It premiered on July 4, 2005 on the network's Telebabad line up. The series concluded on February 10, 2006 with a total of 160 episodes.

The series is streaming online on YouTube.

Cast and characters

Lead cast
 Richard Gutierrez as Amante / Miguel / Conde Vergonze

Supporting cast
 Amy Austria as Graciela
 Ariel Rivera as Samuel
 Gardo Versoza as Apo Abukay
 Leo Martinez as Francis
 Boots Anson-Roa as Adela
 Luz Valdez
 Paolo Contis as Adan
 Chynna Ortaleza as Rebecca
 Ramon Christopher as Guillermo
 Emilio Garcia as Luis
 Yayo Aguila as Anita
 John Arcilla as Romeo
 Lorna Tolentino as Amelia
 Isabel Oli as Isabel
 Gabby Eigenmann as Crisanto
 Richard Quan as Bernie
 Stella Ruiz
 Francine Prieto
 JC de Vera as James
 Julianne Lee
 Dion Ignacio as Dario
 LJ Reyes as Dorina
 Mike Tan as Peping
 John Medina
 Ken Punzalan
 Paolo Serano

Guest cast
 Ronaldo Valdez as Arando
 Jestoni Alarcon as Rodolfo
 Sherilyn Reyes as Garela
 Joe Chen as Mei Li
 Alicia Mayer as Sontaya
 Teddy Corpuz as Pikoy
 Miguel Tanfelix as Onyok
 Dionne De Guzman as Benilda
 Joanne Quintas
 Ryan Yllana as Balgog
 Bianca King
 Ruffa Gutierrez
 Nina Ricci Alagao as Babaylan
 Michael De Mesa as Gayoso
 Elvis Gutierrez
 James Blanco as Topel
  Joonee Gamboa as Apo Adlaw
 T-mur Lane Lee as Enchong
 Christian Vasquez as Karuma
 Goyong as Anigma
 Dick Israel as Tanok

References

External links
 

2005 Philippine television series debuts
2006 Philippine television series endings
Fantaserye and telefantasya
Filipino-language television shows
GMA Network drama series
Philippine action television series
Television shows set in the Philippines